Acme Mills Company is a privately held textiles conversion and finishing company based in Bloomfield Hills, Michigan. Founded in 1917, it is now part of the Acme Group.  Activities of the company include cutting, sewing, dyeing, and applying textile finishing to fabrics.

Operations
The company's headquarters is in Bloomfield Hills, Michigan.  Among properties owned by the company is 100,000 square feet of industrial space in Quincy, Michigan which is leased to Paragon Metals.

History
Acme Mills was founded in 1917 as a mill to manufacture cotton batting for use in the automotive industry for seat cushions. It is one of the member companies of the Acme Group. The company is now a supplier of industrial fabrics to automotive, furniture, and aviation seating companies.

Dymetrol
Dymetrol is a woven fabric suspension system. The fabric utilizes a patented elastomeric mono-filament called  that stretches and form a suspension system. The fabric was introduced by Du Pont in 1984 at the SAE Show in Detroit. Dymetrol has been adapted for use in vehicles, furniture, aviation, trains, boats, trucks, and tractors.

Acme Group
Acme Group is headquartered in Bloomfield Hills, Michigan.  Among member companies of the Acme Group are Acme Mills, Great Lakes Filters, and Fairway Products.

Group operations
The Group manages three manufacturing facilities: two are located in Hillsdale, Michigan and the third one is in Santa Teresa, New Mexico.  The Group also maintains a recycling facility in St. Clair Shores, Michigan.

Group corporate governance
, the Acme Group's chief revenue officer and chief financial officer were Matt Utley and Raymond Lambert, respectively.

References

External links
 hytrel

Manufacturing companies based in Michigan
Bloomfield Hills, Michigan
Companies based in Oakland County, Michigan
Manufacturing companies established in 1917
1917 establishments in Michigan